Nigel Pilkington is a British actor, singer, and screenwriter.

Career
Pilkington has appeared in various television programs such as "Grandpa in My Pocket", Cutting It, Trial & Retribution, Roman Mysteries and Richard Hammond's Secret Service.

As a voice actor Pilkington has provided many voices for animated films like Wallace & Gromit: The Curse of the Were-Rabbit and Azur & Asmar: The Princes' Quest, television shows like The Adventures of Bottle Top Bill and His Best Friend Corky, The Jungle Book and Peter Rabbit and also the video games Inazuma Eleven and Ni No Kuni: Wrath of the White Witch.

From Series 19 onwards, he became the UK voice of Percy and Trevor in Thomas & Friends.

Pilkington directed, produced and wrote the short films Alone in 2011, and "That's The Spirit" in 2014.

Pilkington co-wrote, directed and produced the mockumentary podcast series "Dying Breeds", released in 2020.

Filmography

Film

Television

Video games

References

External links
 
 
 

English male television actors
English male voice actors
Living people
English male film actors
People from Bury, Greater Manchester
Year of birth missing (living people)